Sam Simmonds was a British film editor who worked on over thirty productions between 1927 and 1956. For a number of years he worked for the Rank Organisation in various capacities.

Selected filmography

 Poppies of Flanders (1927)
 Tommy Atkins (1928)
 The American Prisoner (1929)
 Young Woodley (1930)
 Harmony Heaven (1930)
 Loose Ends (1930)
 The Flame of Love (1930)
 The Middle Watch (1930)
 Let's Love and Laugh (1931)
 Mr. Bill the Conqueror (1932)
 Old Roses (1935)
 The Deputy Drummer (1935)
 The Man Behind the Mask (1936)
 The Early Bird (1936)
 Rhythm Racketeer (1937)
 Sing as You Swing (1937)
 The Man at the Gate (1941)
 Hard Steel (1942)
 The Great Mr. Handel (1942)
 They Knew Mr. Knight (1946)
 Mister Drake's Duck (1951)
 Song of Paris (1952)
 The Second Mrs. Tanqueray (1952)
 Black 13 (1953)
 Time Is My Enemy (1954)
 Miss Tulip Stays the Night (1955)
 See How They Run (1955)
 Not So Dusty (1956)

Bibliography
 MacNab, Geoffrey. J. Arthur Rank and the British Film Industry. Routledge, 1993.

References

External links

Year of birth unknown
1967 deaths
British film editors